Daffy – The Commando is a 1943 Warner Bros. Looney Tunes cartoon directed by Friz Freleng. The cartoon was released on November 20, 1943, and stars Daffy Duck.

Plot 
Early one morning, somewhere in World War II-era Germany, Commander Von Vultur is pacing back and forth inside his bunker while fuming about how so many American commandos have managed to slip behind German enemy lines undetected. He receives a telegram from the "Gestinko Gestapo", threatening him with his 'ka-rear' if he lets 'vun' more 'kommando' through. Hearing an American warplane overhead, he calls in his batman – Schultz – whom he abuses by knocking him regularly over his helmet with a mallet. They run outside and use a searchlight to search for any more landing commandos and eventually spot one, who just happens to be Daffy floating down on a parachute, whilst singing Billy Bennett's "She Was Poor But She Was Honest" in a fake Cockney accent.

After a quick shout of "Put out those lights!" gets the searchlight turned off temporarily and allows him to land unseen, Daffy uses his fingers on the searchlight's lens to make shadow puppets and dancing chorus girls on the clouds to distract the Germans before hiding behind a curtain that says "asbestos". When Von Vultur opens the curtain, Daffy makes an ugly face similar to the stereotypical Japanese faces used in cartoons at the time (see, for example, Bugs Bunny Nips the Nips), causing Von Vultur to run off frightened.

Back at Von Vultur's bunker, Daffy tricks him into telling him the time and presents him with a ticking time bomb "as a little token of our esteem". Von Vultur hands the bomb off to Schultz, who is literally blown through the roof. When Schultz falls back, Daffy (who was hiding underneath Schultz's helmet) stops Von Vultur from hitting Schultz over the head with a mallet, and instead hits him. Von Vultur chases Daffy to a telephone booth, where Daffy continues to make fun of him.

Daffy jumps in a plane, narrowly avoiding "a whole mess of Messerschmitts". Daffy is shot down by Von Vultur, his plane progressively disintegrating from back to front, eventually leaving just the engine and propeller), with Daffy still clinging to the controls. Daffy runs into what he believes is a tunnel where he can hide, but it turns out to be the barrel of a huge howitzer cannon. Daffy is shot out by Von Vultur. However, Daffy flies unharmed (as a "human cannonball") into Berlin, where (a rotoscoped) Fuehrer Adolf Hitler is giving a speech. Daffy whacks Hitler on the head with a mallet, causing Hitler to yell for Schultz.

Telephone booth scene 
A gag where Daffy is on a pay phone as Von Vultur is trying to get into the booth has Daffy speaking to him in semi-correct German, while holding cue card–like signs with the dialogue translated for the audience (a classic example of "breaking the fourth wall"). In many public domain prints, the signs are illegible, but read as follows:

Daffy 1: "Kannst du nicht sehen, diese Telefon ist busy? Bleiben Sie ruhig!" ("Can you not see this telephone is busy? Stay calm!")
Sign 1: ENGLISH TRANSLATION: "Can't you see this telephone is busy? Wait your turn!"

Daffy 2: "Bitte, mein Herr, haben Sie ein Fünf-Pfennig-Stück?" ("Please, sir, have you a five pfennig coin?") "Danke schön." ("Thank you very much.")
Sign 2: "Got a nickel, bud?"

Daffy 3: "It's all yours, Von Limburger!"
Sign 3: GERMAN TRANSLATION: "Ich bin fertig mit der Telefon, Herr Von Limburger." ("I'm done with the telephone, Mr. Von Limburger.")

When Von Vultur enters the phone booth, he attempts to contact Schultz, but instead gets an operator, replying: "Ist dat you, Myrt?" This is a reference to the American radio comedy series Fibber McGee and Molly, which was popular at the time. Myrtle was the never-heard switchboard operator in the show ("Is that you, Myrt?" was a popular catchphrase in it that referred to her).

Home media
This short, as well as a few other Warner Bros. shorts, is in the public domain. This is due to United Artists (successor-in-interest to Associated Artists Productions) neglecting to renew the copyright in time. It was also featured in Bugs & Daffy: The Wartime Cartoons (1989) (MGM/UA), and then on the Looney Tunes Golden Collection: Volume 6. An episode of Futurama uses a short clip of the short in the screen gag on the opening sequence.

See also
 Herr Meets Hare
 List of World War II short films
 List of films in the public domain in the United States

References

External links

 
 
 
 
 Film Annex

1943 films
1943 animated films
1943 short films
1940s American animated films
1940s animated short films
Looney Tunes shorts
American World War II propaganda shorts
Films about Nazi Germany
Daffy Duck films
Short films directed by Friz Freleng
Cultural depictions of Adolf Hitler
Animation based on real people
Films scored by Carl Stalling
Films produced by Leon Schlesinger
Films with screenplays by Michael Maltese